Re or Reed is a village in Gloppen Municipality in Vestland county, Norway.

Re was the administrative centre of the former municipality of Breim which existed from 1886 to 1964. Breim Church and Reed School are both located in the village.

See also
Eurofoto

References

Villages in Vestland
Gloppen